The Minnesota Fighting Saints was the name of two professional ice hockey teams based in Saint Paul, Minnesota, that played in the World Hockey Association. The first team was one of the WHA's original twelve franchises, playing from 1972 to 1976. The second team was relocated from Cleveland, Ohio, and played for part of the 1976–77 season. Neither edition of the franchise completed its final season of play.

Original team
Founded in November 1971, the first Fighting Saints team played four seasons beginning in 1972–73 under the ownership of nine local businessmen. (St. Paul attorney Wayne Belisle purchased the team late in the 1973–74 season. Belisle was the front man for a group of owners that included Jock Irvine.) The Saints' first game, a 4–3 loss to the Winnipeg Jets, was played October 13, 1972, at the St. Paul Auditorium. The team moved to the new St. Paul Civic Center, which opened in January 1973. The first game in the new arena was on January 1, 1973, a 4–4 overtime tie with the Houston Aeros.

The team colors were royal blue, white and new gold. The name was taken from the St. Paul Saints of the Central Hockey League, who had used the nickname "Fighting Saints" in promotional material.

The team originally had three sets of jerseys—white, blue and gold—all bearing the Saints "S" logo on the front, with the word "Saints" across the middle of the "S." (The gold jerseys were rarely used, and were worn only in the first season.) When the Saints left the St. Paul Auditorium for the new Civic Center on January 1, 1973, the familiar "little saint" logo replaced the "S" on the white and blue jerseys. While a halo was part of the team's "little saint" logo in promotions and advertising, it was never used on the jersey.

At the outset, the Saints had a policy of favoring local players, with the 1972–73 roster featuring no fewer than 11 athletes who were either born in Minnesota or were at least American citizens (as in the case of former Team USA players Keith Christiansen, George Konik and Carl Wetzel). This was almost unheard of in the early 1970s, when few NHL or WHA teams had even a single American player. In fact, one of the players the Saints selected in the inaugural WHA draft in 1972 was Wendell Anderson, a former star defenseman at the University of Minnesota and a member of the silver medal-winning Team USA squad at the 1956 Winter Olympics. Anderson said he was flattered, but he chose not to join the Saints and instead stuck to his day job—as Governor of Minnesota.

The Saints never missed the playoffs nor had a losing record. Perhaps even more impressively given that they were in direct competition with the Minnesota North Stars of the established National Hockey League, the Fighting Saints always drew more fans than the WHA average. On a few occasions, the Fighting Saints drew more attendance than their local NHL rivals. They also boasted a handful of expensive marquee players such as Mike Walton, Dave Keon and John McKenzie. Eventually, it was the team's high payroll that largely contributed to its demise, as it was an expense that even above-average WHA gate receipts could not meet. More critically, due to the lack of a marketable star in Gordie Howe or Bobby Hull's mold, the Saints were unable to secure a lucrative television deal that could have relieved their growing financial woes.

In 1975–76, the Saints had a record of 30–25–4 and were second in the West behind the Houston Aeros when they ceased operations because of financial struggles. Saints officials announced on December 31, 1975, that the team was broke, and the players would continue to play without pay. (Belisle's group withdrew its backing at the start of the season.) A permanent buyer was never found, and the players received one paycheck in the final two months.

The Fighting Saints' last game was played February 25, 1976, at the Civic Center, a 2–1 overtime loss to the San Diego Mariners in front of an announced crowd of 6,011. The decision to fold the franchise occurred February 28, 1976, in the lobby of the Minneapolis–Saint Paul International Airport, moments before the team was scheduled to board a flight to Cincinnati for a game that night.

Second team

After the NHL's California Golden Seals moved to Cleveland to become the Cleveland Barons, the WHA's Cleveland Crusaders moved to St. Paul for the 1976–77 season. Like their predecessors, this second version of the Saints (called the "New Fighting Saints" in advertising and promotional material) had a winning record through their first 42 games (19–18–5), but owner Nick Mileti was unable to sell the team to local buyers.

The "New" Fighting Saints played their final game on January 14, 1977, a 9–5 home win over the Indianapolis Racers. The franchise officially folded on January 20, 1977. The team's logo and uniforms were identical to the first team's, but with scarlet replacing royal blue.

Players

Ted Hampson was the Saints' captain in their first four seasons. In the final season, Ron Ward was the team captain, replaced on December 28, 1976, by John Arbour.

Among the Saints' notable players in their brief history were Wayne Connelly (the team's career scoring leader), Mike Walton, Mike Antonovich (the team's career games leader), Hockey Hall of Famer Dave Keon, John McKenzie and Rick Smith, and goalies Mike Curran and John Garrett. In the 1974 WHA semifinals against Houston, controversial forward Bill "Goldie" Goldthorpe played three games for the Fighting Saints, compiling no points and 25 penalty minutes. (The 1977 movie Slap Shot featured a wild player named Ogie Oglethorpe, based on Goldthorpe.) Veteran NHL coach Bruce Boudreau made his professional debut with the Saints, playing 30 games in the 1975–76 season and scoring three goals and six assists.

The last active Fighting Saints player from both incarnations in major professional hockey was Jack Carlson who retired after the 1986-87 NHL season with the North Stars. The last active Fighting Saint was Bruce Boudreau who played in the American Hockey League until 1992. In 1995-96, Mike Antonovich came out of retirement as a player-coach playing a  few games in the United Hockey League.

Executives and staff
Glen Sonmor was the Saints general manager throughout their history. Sonmor coached the Saints for the first part of their inaugural season. When Sonmor gave up his coaching duties, assistant coach Harry Neale took over as head coach (his first game was February 17, 1973). Sonmor coached the Saints again during their final season, 1976–77. Neale became head coach of the New England Whalers after the original Saints folded in 1976, and later coached the Vancouver Canucks in the National Hockey League.

The Saints' public address announcers included Al Tighe (1973–74) and Rod Trongard (1974–1977). Team organists included Rob Meads (1973–1976) and Ronnie Newman (1976–77). Jim Bowers often sang the National Anthem. George Nagobads was the team's physician from 1973 to 1976.

Season-by-season record
Note: GP = Games played, W = Wins, L = Losses, T = Ties, Pts = Points, GF = Goals for, GA = Goals against, PIM = Penalties in minutes

Media coverage
Games of the original Fighting Saints were heard on WLOL Radio (1330 AM) from 1972 to 1976, with Frank Buetel as play-by-play announcer. Buetel was the original TV voice of the NHL's Minnesota North Stars from 1967 to 1970 on WTCN-TV (now KARE-TV). Buetel's color commentators included Roger Buxton (1972–73) and Bob Halvorson, the Saints' first-season public relations director (1972–73), and Bill Allard (1973–1976). Al Hirt's version of "When the Saints Go Marching In" was used as the theme song for WLOL's Fighting Saints broadcasts. No local radio station carried games of the New Fighting Saints (1976–77).

Fighting Saints games were televised sporadically on WTCN from 1973 to 1975. The first WTCN game was a home contest versus Cleveland on December 23, 1973, with Buetel and Allard simulcasting. Buxton called subsequent games on WTCN.

On January 7, 1973, CBS aired its first WHA game between the Fighting Saints and Winnipeg Jets live from the new St. Paul Civic Center with Ron Oakes, Gerry Cheevers and Dick Stockton announcing. In the 1973–74 season, one Saints home game was carried on KTCA-TV (PBS). No local TV station aired games of the New Fighting Saints.

The main sponsors of the Fighting Saints on radio and TV were Schmidt Beer and Midwest Federal.

The main sportswriters who covered the Fighting Saints were Charley Hallman of the St. Paul Pioneer Press-Dispatch and John Gilbert of the Minneapolis Tribune.

Notes

References

 
Ice hockey in Minnesota
Defunct ice hockey teams in Minnesota
Ice hockey clubs established in 1972
Ice hockey clubs disestablished in 1977
1972 establishments in Minnesota
1977 disestablishments in Minnesota